Charles W. Jewett (March 14, 1913 – November 3, 2000) was an American politician who was the 93rd Lieutenant Governor of Connecticut from 1955 to 1959.

External links

1913 births
2000 deaths
Lieutenant Governors of Connecticut
20th-century American politicians